Boon (also spelled: Bown) is a town in the northwestern Awdal region of Somaliland.

Overview
Boon is situated about 50 km to the northwest of Borama.

Demographics
The town is inhabited by both the Reer Ahamed subclan of the Jibriil Yoonis and the Ahamed Celi subclan of the Bahabar 'Eli, Mahad 'Ase, both branches of the Gadabuursi Dir clan.

See also
Nimmo
Gondal

Notes

References
Abasa

Archaeological sites in Somalia
Former populated places in Somalia
Cities of the Adal Sultanate